Ariel José Graziani Lentini (born June 7, 1971) is a former football player. He is a naturalized Ecuadorian striker who represented the Ecuador national team on 34 occasions between 1997 and 2000. After retiring in Ecuador he is only able to play amateur football, he has chosen to play for Argentinian fifth-level club Atlético Empalme since May, 2007.

Career
Graziani has been a top goalscorer for practically every team for which he has played. He made his professional debut in 1993 with Newell's Old Boys of Argentina, where he was a teammate with Diego Maradona until he transferred later that year to Sport Boys of the Peruvian First Division.

Graziani transferred to the Ecuadorian First Division to play for Aucas in 1995, and moved a year later to join Emelec. During his two years with the club, 1996 and 1997, he led the league in scoring while helping Emelec earn league titles. His standout play earned him a transfer to Morelia of the Mexican Primera División. Again he was one of the top goalscorers for his club and the league.

In 1999, Ariel was acquired by Major League Soccer for a transfer fee of slightly less than $2 million, which at the time was the highest transfer fee ever paid by the league. Graziani was allocated to New England Revolution but played in only three games for the Revolution before he was traded to the Dallas Burn for Colombian international Leonel Álvarez.

Ariel was the leading goalscorer for the Burn in 2000 with 15 goals and 2001 with 11 goals until he was traded to the San Jose Earthquakes for Salvadoran international Ronald Cerritos. In 2002 with the Earthquakes, Graziani, while the team's leading goalscorer with 15 goals, failed to connect adequately with strike partner Landon Donovan. MLS loaned out the final year of his contract. A bidding war between Emelec and Barcelona SC ensued where, in the end, Barcelona offered MLS more money.

In 2003, Graziani, was the top scorer in Ecuador with Barcelona SC. He also scored what was voted the top goal in that year's Copa Libertadores against the eventual winners Boca Juniors. In 2004, he signed with Lanús in Argentina but only managed 4 goals in 17 games and eventually left the same year to return to Barcelona SC and scored 8 goals from 18 games. In 2005, Graziani signed for LDU Quito. He played there until December, 2006, when he officially retired. Nevertheless, in May, 2007, he signed with Atlético Empalme, where he started his career. Empalme in 2007 played for Santa Fe Province in zone 9 of the Torneo del Interior C, a complex regional fifth-level tournament.

Nowadays, Graziani holds a political position in his country of birth Argentina. He is the vice-mayor of a small town called Empalme Villa Constitución where he is trying to help the poorest people in his town.

Honours

Club
 Club Sport Emelec
 Serie A de Ecuador: 1996
 LDU Quito
 Serie A de Ecuador: 2005

Nation
 Ecuador
 Canada Cup: 1999

Achievements
Graziani has played in 33 games for the Ecuador national team during his career, scoring 15 goals for his adopted country. He became top scorer at the 1999 Canada Cup, scoring three goals in three matches.

References

External links

Major League Soccer

1971 births
Living people
Argentine emigrants to Ecuador
Ecuadorian footballers
Argentine footballers
Ecuadorian people of Italian descent
Argentine people of Italian descent
Ecuador international footballers
Ecuadorian expatriate footballers
1997 Copa América players
1999 Copa América players
Newell's Old Boys footballers
Sport Boys footballers
S.D. Aucas footballers
C.S. Emelec footballers
C.D. Veracruz footballers
Atlético Morelia players
New England Revolution players
FC Dallas players
San Jose Earthquakes players
Barcelona S.C. footballers
Club Atlético Lanús footballers
L.D.U. Quito footballers
Argentine Primera División players
Expatriate footballers in Ecuador
Expatriate footballers in Mexico
Expatriate footballers in Peru
Expatriate soccer players in the United States
Ecuadorian expatriate sportspeople in the United States
Ecuadorian expatriate sportspeople in Mexico
Ecuadorian football managers
Major League Soccer players
Major League Soccer All-Stars
Liga MX players
Peruvian Primera División players
Naturalized citizens of Ecuador
Association football forwards
Sportspeople from Santa Fe Province
C.D. Olmedo managers